Penal is a town in south Trinidad, Trinidad and Tobago. It lies south of San Fernando, Princes Town, and Debe, and north of Moruga, Morne Diablo and Siparia.

History 
Up to the 19th century the area was called Peñal by the then Spanish administration. It was uninhibited until the early 20th century. It was originally a rice- and cocoa-producing area but is now a rapidly expanding and developing town. The population is 12,281.

Economy 
The heart of Penal contains many businesses while the outskirts focus on agricultural development. Penal has a market, police station, branches of three banks (Scotiabank, Republic Bank and First Citizens Bank) health facilities, grocery stores, convenience stores, bars, fast food restaurants, service stations, restaurants, puja stores, an Indian expo, and clothing stores.

Penal plays a major role in the energy supply to the nation's populace. Petrotrin, the national oil company, has a major sub-unit in Clarke Road and the National Gas Company has gas lines running through Penal that links the gas fields of the South East Coast and the industrial estates. One of the countries three major power generating plants owned by Powergen Ltd is located at Syne Village to the west of Penal.

Abdool Village, Aquart Village, Backar Yard, Bakhen, Batchyia Village, Charlo Village, La Costena Gardens, Mendez Village, Digity Village, Penal Rock-Bunsee Tr. Village, Penal Quinam Road Village, Sou Sou Lands, San Francique  and Syne Village are located in Penal.

Penal's local government is administered by the Penal–Debe Regional Corporation. Penal is a part of the Siparia and Oropouche West constituency.

The Trinidad and Tobago national cricket team have played matches holding first-class and List A status at the Wilson Road Recreation Ground.

Notable residents 

 Kamla Persad-Bissessar – Seventh Prime Minister of Trinidad and Tobago
 Drupatee Ramgoonai – Chutney and Chutney Soca singer
 David Williams – cricketer

References 

Populated places in Trinidad and Tobago